Mansur, Dharwad is a village in Dharwad district of Karnataka, India.

Demographics 
As of the 2011 Census of India there were 572 households in Mansur and a total population of 2,808 consisting of 1,416 males and 1,392 females. There were 401 children ages 0-6.

References

Villages in Dharwad district